Wigan is a constituency in Greater Manchester, represented in the House of Commons of the UK Parliament since 2010 by Lisa Nandy of the Labour Party, who also serves as the Shadow Housing and Levelling Up Secretary.

History

Wigan was incorporated as a borough on 26 August 1246, after the issue of a charter by Henry III. In 1295 and January 1307 Wigan was one of the significant places called upon to send a representative, then known as a 'burgess', to the Model Parliament. However, for the remainder of the medieval period the seat was not summoned to send an official despite being one of only four boroughs in Lancashire possessing Royal Charters; the others were Lancaster, Liverpool and Preston. This changed in the Tudor period with Henry VIII's grant of two Members of Parliament to the town.

Following the Redistribution of Seats Act 1885, single-member constituencies were imposed nationwide, meaning the seat saw a reduction of the number of its members.

The death of Roger Stott in office in 1999 made him the fourth Wigan MP in the twentieth century to die in office (uniquely for a constituency in the United Kingdom); the others were John Parkinson, Ronald Williams and William Foster.

Political history
Wigan is considered a safe seat given that it has been held by the Labour Party since 1918, with solid majorities ranging from 1,018 votes (2.2%) in 1931 to 22,643 votes (51.7%) in 1997.

Prominent frontbenchers

Boundaries

1832–1918: The Township of Wigan.
In 1835 Wigan became a Municipal borough, using the then current Parliamentary boundaries of the Township.
In 1888 Wigan Municipal Borough became the County Borough of Wigan on the same boundaries.
In 1904 Pemberton Urban District was dissolved, with the area covered by it becoming part of the County Borough of Wigan. However, for Parliamentary purposes, that area remained part of South-West Lancashire, Ince Division until the Parliamentary boundaries were redefined in 1918.

1918–1983: The County Borough of Wigan
In 1974 the Country Borough of Wigan was abolished and superseded by the Metropolitan Borough of Wigan, covering a far greater area. However, the boundary of the Parliamentary Constituency of Wigan remained unchanged until 1983, when it was expanded to cover the northern part of the Metropolitan Borough.

1983–1997: The Metropolitan Borough of Wigan wards of Aspull-Standish, Beech Hill, Ince, Langtree, Newtown, Norley, Swinley, Whelley.

1997–2010: The Metropolitan Borough of Wigan wards of Aspull-Standish, Beech Hill, Langtree, Newtown, Norley, Swinley, Whelley.
In 2004, new ward boundaries in the Metropolitan Borough of Wigan came in to effect. However, the Parliamentary boundaries remained unchanged until they were reviewed and adjusted to line up with the new ward boundaries in 2010.

2010–present: The Metropolitan Borough of Wigan wards of Aspull, New Springs and Whelley; Douglas; Ince; Pemberton; Shevington with Lower Ground; Standish with Langtree; Wigan Central; Wigan West.

Constituency profile
The seat is productive and has excellent links to Manchester, as well as close links to the M6, which lies just within its western border. However, over the past century, Wigan has witnessed a fall in manufacturing, particularly in the production of textiles, which have been unable to compete with the Indian subcontinent and the Far East. Another industry which has suffered is coal mining, which had been a large employer in this part of Lancashire up until the mid-20th century. There are some industrial areas remaining in and around the town centre. The Leeds and Liverpool Canal flows through the town, including the famous Wigan Pier area.

As of May 2018, the rate of JSA and Universal Credit claimants was 3.9%, higher than the national average of 2.8% and regional average of 3.7%, based on a statistical compilation by the House of Commons Library. The constituency also includes more desirable semi-rural residential villages to the north of Wigan town centre such as Standish and Appley Bridge which are relatively more affluent.

Members of Parliament

MPs 1295–1640

MPs 1640–1885

MPs since 1885

Notes

Elections

Elections in the 2010s

Elections in the 2000s

Elections in the 1990s

Elections in the 1980s

Elections in the 1970s

Elections in the 1960s

Elections in the 1950s

Elections in the 1940s 

}

Elections in the 1930s 
}

}

Elections in the 1920s

Elections in the 1910s 

General Election 1914–15:

Another General Election was required to take place before the end of 1915. The political parties had been making preparations for an election to take place and by July 1914, the following candidates had been selected; 
Unionist: Reginald Neville
Labour: Henry Twist

Elections in the 1900s

Elections in the 1890s

Elections in the 1880s 

 Caused by Knowles' death.

 Caused by the previous election being declared void on petition.

 Caused by Lindsay's elevation to the peerage, becoming Earl of Crawford and Balcarres. This by-election was later voided on petition.

Elections in the 1870s

Elections in the 1860s

 
 

 

 Caused by Lindsay's resignation due to prolonged service in Canada in the British Army.

Elections in the 1850s

 
  

  
 

 
  

 Caused by Thicknesse's death.

Elections in the 1840s

 

 
 

 Caused by Greenall's death.

After the 1841 election, Crosse was unseated on petition and Standish was declared elected in his place on 11 April 1842.

Elections in the 1830s

 
 

 Caused by Potter's resignation

 
 
 
  

 
 
 

 
 
 
 

 
 
 
 

 
 

 Caused by Hodson's resignation

See also 
 List of parliamentary constituencies in Greater Manchester

Notes

References

Sources 
Robert Beatson, A Chronological Register of Both Houses of Parliament (London: Longman, Hurst, Res & Orme, 1807) A Chronological Register of Both Houses of the British Parliament, from the Union in 1708, to the Third Parliament of the United Kingdom of Great Britain and Ireland, in 1807
D Brunton & D H Pennington, Members of the Long Parliament (London: George Allen & Unwin, 1954)
Cobbett's Parliamentary history of England, from the Norman Conquest in 1066 to the year 1803 (London: Thomas Hansard, 1808) titles A-Z
F W S Craig, British Parliamentary Election Results 1832–1885 (2nd edition, Aldershot: Parliamentary Research Services, 1989)
 Maija Jansson (ed.), Proceedings in Parliament, 1614 (House of Commons) (Philadelphia: American Philosophical Society, 1988)
 J E Neale, The Elizabethan House of Commons (London: Jonathan Cape, 1949)
Henry Stooks Smith, The Parliaments of England from 1715 to 1847 (2nd edition, edited by FWS Craig - Chichester: Parliamentary Reference Publications, 1973)

Parliamentary constituencies in Greater Manchester
Constituencies of the Parliament of the United Kingdom established in 1295
Politics of the Metropolitan Borough of Wigan
Wigan